Mohammad Reza Rasoul Korbekandi (born 27 January 1953) is a retired Iranian football player and now manager.

He was a member of the Iran squad (as reserved goalkeeper) which participated at the 1978 FIFA World Cup.

Coaching career

Honours

As a manager
Zob Ahan
Hazfi Cup (1): 2002–03
Iran Pro League Runner up (1): 2004–05

References

Iranian footballers
Iran international footballers
Association football goalkeepers
1978 FIFA World Cup players
Zob Ahan Esfahan F.C. players
Sepahan S.C. managers
Iranian football managers
Sportspeople from Isfahan
1953 births
Living people
Zob Ahan Esfahan F.C. managers
Bargh Shiraz F.C. managers
Saba Qom F.C. managers
Persian Gulf Pro League managers